Marjolaine Meynier-Millefert is a French politician representing La République En Marche! and Territories of Progress. She was elected to the French National Assembly on 18 June 2017, representing Isère's 10th constituency.

Born in September 1982 in Échirolles, to a Dutch mother, Meynier-Millefert grew up in Montagnieu, then continued her studies in Lyon, Paris, and Grenoble. She then became a teacher of English.

In 2013, she created a communication company for small and medium-sized businesses.

In December 2015, she ran in the regional council elections on the list of socialist Jean-Jack Queyranne, without herself being a member of the Socialist Party, and was elected.

In 2016, she coordinated the En Marche Committees in the north of Isère, and was selected by this movement as a candidate for legislative elections in the tenth constituency of this department. In the second round, she was elected with 64.62% of the votes cast, against the FN candidate.

She specializes in the subject of energy renovation. She was appointed rapporteur of the Commission of Inquiry on the economic, industrial and environmental impact of renewable energies, on the transparency of financing and on the social acceptability of energy transition policies, on March 7, 2019. She represents the French National Assembly to the Higher Council for Building and Energy Efficiency.

References

1982 births
Living people
People from Échirolles
La République En Marche! politicians
Territories of Progress politicians
Deputies of the 15th National Assembly of the French Fifth Republic
Deputies of the 16th National Assembly of the French Fifth Republic
Regional councillors of Auvergne-Rhône-Alpes
Women members of the National Assembly (France)
21st-century French women politicians